Malarikkal is a small tourism hamlet located in Thiruvarpu panchayat in Kottayam town of Kerala, India. It is a rising tourist hotbed located in the southern tip of India. Malarikkal is the most visited tourist destination in 2019.

Places nearby
Thiruvarppu
Kumarakom
Chengalam South
Vaikom
Kottayam

Economy
Fishing, agriculture and tourism are the major economic activities. Malarikkal's perfectly balanced tropical climate is very conducive to cultivation. The place has expanses of mangrove forests, paddy fields and coconut groves. Fruits like Banana, Mango, Jackfruit, Ambazhanga, Puli (Tamarind), Chaambenga, Peraycka (Guava), Aathaycka and Pineapple grow here. Also, cocoa and coffee, chena(yam) and chembu (colocasia), grow well and were cultivated under the coconut trees. This rich agricultural environment is mainly irrigated using interspersed waterways and canals of the Meenachil river. The smaller canals are often lined by hibiscus plants which lean partly over the canals to form a green canopy, from which hang the lovely hibiscus flowers.

Modes of access
One can access Malarikkal by many means:
 By road:KSRTC(6.9 kilometres) Buses and taxis are easily available at all times of the day from Kottayam.

References

Populated places in Kerala
Kottayam district
Tourism in Kerala